A batholith is a large mass of intrusive igneous rock (also called plutonic rock), larger than  in area, that forms from cooled magma deep in Earth's crust. Batholiths are almost always made mostly of felsic or intermediate rock types, such as granite, quartz monzonite, or diorite (see also granite dome).

Formation
Although they may appear uniform, batholiths are in fact structures with complex histories and compositions. They are composed of multiple masses, or plutons, bodies of igneous rock of irregular dimensions (typically at least several kilometers) that can be distinguished from adjacent igneous rock by some combination of criteria including age, composition, texture, or mappable structures. Individual plutons are solidified from magma that traveled toward the surface from a zone of partial melting near the base of the Earth's crust.

Traditionally, these plutons have been considered to form by ascent of relatively buoyant magma in large masses called plutonic diapirs. Because the diapirs are liquified and very hot, they tend to rise through the surrounding native country rock, pushing it aside and partially melting it. Most diapirs do not reach the surface to form volcanoes, but instead they slow down, cool, and usually solidify 5 to 30 kilometers underground as plutons (hence the use of the word pluton; in reference to the Roman god of the underworld Pluto). An alternate view is that plutons commonly are formed not by ascent of large magma diapirs, but rather by aggregation of smaller volumes of magma that ascend as dikes.

A batholith is formed when many plutons converge to form a huge expanse of granitic rock. Some batholiths are mammoth, paralleling past and present subduction zones and other heat sources for hundreds of kilometers in continental crust. One such batholith is the Sierra Nevada Batholith, which is a continuous granitic formation that makes up much of the Sierra Nevada in California. An even larger batholith, the Coast Plutonic Complex, is found predominantly in the Coast Mountains of western Canada; it extends for 1,800 kilometers and reaches into southeastern Alaska.

Surface expression and erosion
A batholith is an exposed area of (mostly) continuous plutonic rock that covers an area larger than 100 square kilometers (40 square miles). Areas smaller than 100 square kilometers are called stocks. However, the majority of batholiths visible at the surface (via outcroppings) have areas far greater than 100 square kilometers. These areas are exposed to the surface through the process of erosion accelerated by continental uplift acting over many tens of millions to hundreds of millions of years. This process has removed several tens of square kilometers of overlying rock in many areas, exposing the once deeply buried batholiths.

Batholiths exposed at the surface are subjected to huge pressure differences between their former location deep in the earth and their new location at or near the surface. As a result, their crystal structure expands slightly over time. This manifests itself by a form of mass wasting called exfoliation. This form of weathering causes convex and relatively thin sheets of rock to slough off the exposed surfaces of batholiths (a process accelerated by frost wedging). The result is fairly clean and rounded rock faces. A well-known result of this process is Half Dome in Yosemite Valley.

Examples

Africa
Aswan Granite Batholith
Cape Coast Batholith, Ghana
Heerenveen Batholith, South Africa
Paarl Rock, South Africa
Darling Batholith, South Africa
Hook granite massif, Zambia
Mubende Batholith, Uganda

Antarctica
Antarctic Peninsula Batholith
Queen Maud Batholith

Asia
Angara-Vitim batholith, Siberia
Bhongir Fort Batholith, Telangana, India
Chibagalakh batholith, Siberia
Mount Abu, India 
Gangdese batholith, Himalaya
Trans-Himalayan Batholith, Himalaya
Kalba-Narym batholith, Kazakhstan
Karakorum Batholith, Himalaya
Tak batholith, Thailand
Tien Shan batholith, Central Asia
Ranchi batholith, India

Europe
Bindal Batholith, Norway
Cornubian batholith, England
Corsica-Sardinia Batholith
Donegal batholith, Ireland
Leinster Batholith, Ireland
Mancellian batholith, France
North Pennine Batholith, England
Ljusdal Batholith, Sweden
Mt-Louis-Andorra Batholith
Riga Batholith, Latvia
Salmi Batholith, Republic of Karelia, Russia
Sunnhordaland Batholith, Norway
Transscandinavian Igneous Belt, Sweden and Norway
Revsund Massif
Rätan Batholith
Småland–Värmland Belt
Vitosha - Plana, Sofia, Bulgaria

North America
Bald Rock Batholith
Boulder Batholith
British Virgin Islands
Chambers-Strathy Batholith
Chilliwack batholith
Golden Horn Batholith
Idaho Batholith
Ilimaussaq Batholith, Greenland
Kenosha Batholith
 Mount Stuart Batholith, Washington
Wallowa Batholith, Oregon
Peninsular Ranges, Baja and Southern California
Pike's Peak Granite Batholith
Ruby Mountains
Rio Verde Batholith, Mexico
San Lorenzo Batholith, Puerto Rico
Sierra Nevada Batholith
South Mountain Batholith, Nova Scotia
Town Mountain Granite batholith, Texas
Wyoming batholith

Oceania
Cullen Batholith, Australia
Kosciuszko Batholith, Australia
Moruya Batholith, Australia
Scottsdale Batholith, Australia 
Median Batholith, New Zealand
New England Batholith, Australia

South America
Achala Batholith, Argentina 
Antioquia Batholith, Colombia
Guanambi Batholith, Bahia, Brazil 
Parguaza rapakivi granite Batholith, Venezuela and Colombia
Cerro Aspero Batholith, Argentina
Coastal Batholith of Peru
Colangüil Batholith, Argentina
Cordillera Blanca Batholith, Peru
Vicuña Mackenna Batholith, Chile
Elqui-Limarí Batholith, Chile and Argentina
Futrono-Riñihue Batholith, Chile
Illescas Batholith, Uruguay
Coastal Batholith of central Chile
Panguipulli Batholith, Chile
Patagonian Batholith, Chile and Argentina
North Patagonian Batholith
South Patagonian Batholith

See also
 Laccolith
 Sill
 Stock
 Volcanic plug

References

 Plummer, McGeary, Carlson, Physical Geology, Eighth Edition (McGraw-Hill: Boston, 1999) pages 61–63 
 Glazner, Bartley, Coleman, Gray, Taylor, Are plutons assembled over millions of years by amalgamation from small magma chambers?, GSA Today: Vol. 14, No. 4, pp. 4–11

External links
Idaho Batholith
The Cornubian Batholith

Volcanism